Alias Jimmy Valentine is a 1915 American silent crime film directed by Maurice Tourneur and starring Robert Warwick, Robert Cummings and Alec B. Francis. It is based on the 1910 play of the same title, which was subsequently made into films again in 1920 and 1928. The play was based on the O. Henry short story "A Retrieved Reformation".

Plot

Cast
 Robert Warwick as Jimmy Valentine   
 Robert W. Cummings  as Doyle  
 Alec B. Francis as Bill Avery  
 Frederick Truesdell as Lt. Gov. Fay  
 Ruth Shepley as Rose Fay  
 Johnny Hines as Red Joclyn  
 D.J. Flanagan as Cotton  
 Walter Craven as Handler  
 John Boone as Blinkey Davis 
 Thomas Mott Osborne as himself  
 Nora Cecil as Nurse  
 Madge Evans as Child Locked in Vault

See also
 Alias Jimmy Valentine (radio program)

References

Bibliography
 Waldman, Harry. Maurice Tourneur: The Life and Films. McFarland, 2001.

External links
 

1915 films
1915 crime films
American crime films
Films directed by Maurice Tourneur
American silent feature films
1910s English-language films
American black-and-white films
World Film Company films
1910s American films